The 1996 Dwars door België was the 51st edition of the Dwars door Vlaanderen cycle race and was held on 27 March 1996. The race started and finished in Waregem. The race was won by Tristan Hoffman.

General classification

References

1996
1996 in road cycling
1996 in Belgian sport
March 1996 sports events in Europe